Explanation II: Instrumental Themes and Dream Sequences is an album by American indie rock band The Olivia Tremor Control, initially released as a bonus CD with the first few thousand copies of their 1996 debut album Music from the Unrealized Film Script: Dusk at Cubist Castle. It consists of nine tracks of ambient sounds, recorded by The Olivia Tremor Control, and it has been claimed that the album will produce quadraphonic sound when played in synchronicity with Dusk at Cubist Castle. Explanation II was later re-released on its own by Flydaddy Records in 1998.

Track listing
All songs written by The Olivia Tremor Control.

 "Cycle 1" – 8:08
 "Cycle 2" – 4.59
 "Cycle 3" – 7:41
 "Cycle 4" – 7:00
 "Cycle 5" – 11:37
 "Cycle 6" – 3:13
 "Cycle 7" – 10:55
 "Cycle 8" – 9:07
 "Cycle 9" – 5:45

References

1999 albums
The Olivia Tremor Control albums